The chapters of Japanese manga Angel Heart are written and illustrated by Tsukasa Hojo.

The 1st season has been released in 2 editions, the first time edited by Bunch Comics simply under the title Angel Heart, the second time by Zenon Comics DX as Angel Heart: 1st Season.

Volume list

Angel Heart

Angel Heart: 1st Season

Angel Heart: 2nd Season

References

Angel Heart